Paton et al. (2019) list the following species of Coleus (around 300), many transferred from Plectranthus. , Plants of the World Online listed 301 accepted species.

Coleus abyssinicus (Fresen.) A.J.Paton
Coleus acariformis (P.I.Forst.) P.I.Forst.
Coleus achankoviliensis Smitha & A.J.Paton
Coleus actites (P.I.Forst.) P.I.Forst.
Coleus adenanthus (Dalzell & A.Gibson) A.J.Paton
Coleus adenophorus (Gürke) A.J.Paton
Coleus aegyptiacus (Forssk.) A.J.Paton
Coleus affinis (Gürke) A.J.Paton
Coleus albicalyx (Suddee) Suddee
Coleus aliciae (Codd) A.J.Paton
Coleus alloplectus (S.T.Blake) P.I.Forst. & T.C.Wilson
Coleus alpinus Vatke
Coleus altanmouiensis (T.C.Wilson, P.I.Forst. & M.A.M.Renner) T.C.Wilson & P.I.Forst.
Coleus amboinicus Lour.
Coleus amicorum (S.T.Blake) P.I.Forst. & T.C.Wilson
Coleus amiculatus (T.C.Wilson, P.I.Forst. & M.A.M.Renner) T.C.Wilson & P.I.Forst.
Coleus amoenus (P.I.Forst.) P.I.Forst.
Coleus anamudianus (Smitha & Sunojk.) Smitha
Coleus angolensis (G.Taylor) A.J.Paton
Coleus angulatus (Hedge) A.J.Paton & Phillipson
Coleus anthonyi Jebin Joseph & J.Mathew
Coleus apoensis Elmer
Coleus apreptus (S.T.Blake) P.I.Forst. & T.C.Wilson
Coleus apricus (P.I.Forst.) P.I.Forst.
Coleus arabicus Benth.
Coleus arenicola (P.I.Forst.) P.I.Forst.
Coleus argentatus (S.T.Blake) P.I.Forst. & T.C.Wilson
Coleus argenteus (Gamble) A.J.Paton
Coleus argentifolius (Ryding) A.J.Paton
Coleus articulatus (I.M.Johnst.) A.J.Paton
Coleus ater A.J.Paton
Coleus auriglandulosus (A.J.Paton) A.J.Paton
Coleus australis (R.Br.) A.J.Paton
Coleus autranii Briq.
Coleus barbatus (Andrews) Benth. ex G.Don
Coleus bariensis (Ryding) A.J.Paton
Coleus batesii (Baker) A.J.Paton
Coleus batianoffii (P.I.Forst.) P.I.Forst.
Coleus bellus (P.I.Forst.) P.I.Forst.
Coleus betonicifolius (Baker) A.J.Paton
Coleus bifidus (A.J.Paton) A.J.Paton
Coleus bipartitus (P.I.Forst.) P.I.Forst.
Coleus bishopianus (Gamble) Smitha & A.J.Paton
Coleus blakei (P.I.Forst.) P.I.Forst.
Coleus bojeri Benth.
Coleus bolavenensis Suddee, Tagane & Rueangr.
Coleus botryosus (A.J.Paton) A.J.Paton
Coleus bourneae (Gamble) Smitha & A.J.Paton
Coleus bracteatus Dunn
Coleus brazzavillensis A.Chev.
Coleus buchananii (Baker) Brenan
Coleus burorum Chiov.
Coleus caillei A.Chev. ex Hutch. & Dalziel
Coleus calaminthoides (Baker) A.J.Paton
Coleus calcicola Murata
Coleus caldericola (P.I.Forst.) P.I.Forst.
Coleus calycinus (Benth.) A.J.Paton
Coleus cambodianus (Murata) A.J.Paton
Coleus caninus (B.Heyne ex Roth) Vatke
Coleus carnosifolius (Hemsl.) Dunn
Coleus cataractarum (B.J.Pollard) A.J.Paton
Coleus caudatus (S.Moore) E.Downes & I.Darbysh.
Coleus celsus A.J.Paton
Coleus centraliafricanus A.J.Paton
Coleus chevalieri Briq.
Coleus ciliatus (Bramley) A.J.Paton
Coleus circinnatus (Hedge) A.J.Paton & Phillipson
Coleus coeruleus Gürke
Coleus comosus Hochst. ex Gürke
Coleus confertiflorus (A.J.Paton) A.J.Paton
Coleus congensis (Gürke) A.J.Paton
Coleus congestus (R.Br.) A.J.Paton
Coleus conglomeratus (T.C.E.Fr.) Robyns & Lebrun
Coleus crassus (N.E.Br.) Culham
Coleus cremnus (B.J.Conn) A.J.Paton
Coleus cucullatus (A.J.Paton) A.J.Paton
Coleus cuneatus Baker f.
Coleus cyanophyllus (P.I.Forst.) P.I.Forst.
Coleus cylindraceus (Hochst. ex Benth.) A.J.Paton
Coleus daviesii E.A.Bruce
Coleus decimus (A.J.Paton) A.J.Paton
Coleus decurrens Gürke
Coleus deflexifolius (Baker) A.J.Paton
Coleus defoliatus (Hochst. ex Benth.) A.J.Paton
Coleus densus (N.E.Br.) A.J.Paton
Coleus descampsii (Briq.) A.J.Paton
Coleus dewildemanianus (Robyns & Lebrun) A.J.Paton
Coleus dichotomus (A.J.Paton) A.J.Paton
Coleus dinteri (Briq.) A.J.Paton
Coleus dissitiflorus Gürke
Coleus divaricatus A.J.Paton
Coleus diversus (S.T.Blake) P.I.Forst. & T.C.Wilson
Coleus dolichopodus (Briq.) A.J.Paton
Coleus dumicola (P.I.Forst.) P.I.Forst.
Coleus dysophylloides (Benth.) A.J.Paton
Coleus efoliatus De Wild.
Coleus elliotii (S.Moore) A.J.Paton
Coleus elongatus Trimen
Coleus eminii (Gürke) A.J.Paton
Coleus engleri (Briq.) A.J.Paton
Coleus erici-rosenii (R.E.Fr.) A.J.Paton
Coleus esculentus (N.E.Br.) G.Taylor
Coleus eungellaensis A.J.Paton
Coleus excelsus (P.I.Forst.) P.I.Forst.
Coleus exilis (A.J.Paton) A.J.Paton
Coleus fasciculatus (P.I.Forst.) P.I.Forst.
Coleus ferricola Phillipson, O.Hooper & A.J.Paton
Coleus foetidus (Benth.) A.J.Paton
Coleus foliatus (A.J.Paton) A.J.Paton
Coleus forsteri (Benth.) A.J.Paton
Coleus fragrantissimus (P.I.Forst.) P.I.Forst.
Coleus fredericii G.Taylor
Coleus fruticosus Wight ex Benth.
Coleus galeatus (Vahl) Benth.
Coleus gamblei (Smitha & Sunojk.) Smitha
Coleus garckeanus Vatke
Coleus geminatus (P.I.Forst.) P.I.Forst.
Coleus gibbosus A.J.Paton
Coleus gigantifolius (Suddee) Suddee
Coleus gillettii (J.K.Morton) A.J.Paton
Coleus glabriflorus (P.I.Forst.) P.I.Forst.
Coleus globosus (Ryding) A.J.Paton
Coleus goetzenii (Gürke) A.J.Paton
Coleus gossweileri A.J.Paton
Coleus gracilipedicellatum (Robyns & Lebrun) A.J.Paton
Coleus gracilis Gürke
Coleus gracillimus (T.C.E.Fr.) Robyns & Lebrun
Coleus graminifolius (Perkins) A.J.Paton
Coleus grandicalyx E.A.Bruce
Coleus grandidentatus (Gürke) A.J.Paton
Coleus graniticola (A.Chev.) A.J.Paton
Coleus gratus (S.T.Blake) P.I.Forst. & T.C.Wilson
Coleus graveolens (R.Br.) A.J.Paton
Coleus guerkei (Briq.) A.J.Paton
Coleus gymnostomus Gürke
Coleus habrophyllus (P.I.Forst.) P.I.Forst.
Coleus hadiensis (Forssk.) A.J.Paton
Coleus hairulii Kiew
Coleus hallii (J.K.Morton) A.J.Paton
Coleus harmandii (Doan ex Suddee & A.J.Paton) A.J.Paton
Coleus helferi (Hook.f.) A.J.Paton
Coleus hereroensis (Engl.) A.J.Paton
Coleus hijazensis (Abdel Khalik) A.J.Paton
Coleus humulopsis (B.J.Pollard) A.J.Paton
Coleus hymalis (J.R.I.Wood) A.J.Paton
Coleus idukkianus (J.Mathew, Yohannan & B.J.Conn) Smitha
Coleus igniarioides (Ryding) A.J.Paton
Coleus igniarius Schweinf.
Coleus ignotus (A.J.Paton) A.J.Paton
Coleus inflatus Benth.
Coleus inselbergi (B.J.Pollard & A.J.Paton) A.J.Paton
Coleus insignis (Hook.f.) A.J.Paton
Coleus insolitus (C.H.Wright) Robyns & Lebrun
Coleus insularis (P.I.Forst.) P.I.Forst.
Coleus intraterraneus (S.T.Blake) P.I.Forst. & T.C.Wilson
Coleus kanneliyensis L.H.Cramer & S. Balas.
Coleus kanyakumariensis (Shinoj & Sunojk.) Smitha
Coleus kapatensis R.E.Fr.
Coleus kirkii (Baker) A.J.Paton
Coleus kivuensis Lebrun & L.Touss.
Coleus klossii (S.Moore) P.I.Forst. & T.C.Wilson
Coleus koualensis A.Chev. ex Hutch. & Dalziel
Coleus koulikoroensis A.J.Paton
Coleus kunstleri (Prain) A.J.Paton
Coleus lactiflorus Vatke
Coleus laetus (P.I.Forst.) P.I.Forst.
Coleus lageniocalyx Briq.
Coleus lanceolatus (Bojer ex Benth.) A.J.Paton & Phillipson
Coleus lancifolius (Bramley) A.J.Paton
Coleus lanuginosus Hochst. ex Benth.
Coleus lasianthus Gürke
Coleus lateriticola (A.Chev.) Phillipson, O.Hooper & A.J.Paton
Coleus laxus (T.C.Wilson & P.I.Forst.) T.C.Wilson & P.I.Forst.
Coleus leiperi (P.I.Forst.) P.I.Forst.
Coleus linearifolius (J.K.Morton) A.J.Paton
Coleus livingstonei A.J.Paton
Coleus longipetiolatus Gürke
Coleus lyratus (A.Chev.) Roberty
Coleus maculosus (Lam.) A.J.Paton
Coleus madagascariensis (Pers.) A.Chev.
Coleus magnificus P.I.Forst. & A.J.Paton
Coleus malabaricus Benth.
Coleus mannii Hook.f.
Coleus marrubatus (J.K.Morton) A.J.Paton
Coleus megacalyx (A.J.Paton) A.J.Paton
Coleus megadontus (P.I.Forst.) P.I.Forst.
Coleus melleri (Baker) A.J.Paton & Phillipson
Coleus meyeri (Gürke) A.J.Paton
Coleus minor (J.K.Morton) A.J.Paton
Coleus minutiflorus (Ryding) A.J.Paton
Coleus minutus (P.I.Forst.) P.I.Forst.
Coleus mirabilis Briq.
Coleus mirus (S.T.Blake) P.I.Forst. & T.C.Wilson
Coleus mitis (R.A.Clement) A.J.Paton
Coleus modestus (Baker) Robyns & Lebrun
Coleus mollis Benth.
Coleus monostachyus (P.Beauv.) A.J.Paton
Coleus mutabilis (Codd) A.J.Paton
Coleus myrianthellus Briq.
Coleus namuliensis E.Downes & I.Darbysh.
Coleus neochilus (Schltr.) Codd
Coleus nepetifolius (Baker) A.J.Paton
Coleus niamniamensis (Gürke) A.J.Paton
Coleus nigericus (Alston) A.J.Paton
Coleus nitidus (P.I.Forst.) P.I.Forst.
Coleus niveus (Hiern) A.J.Paton
Coleus nyikensis Baker
Coleus omissus (P.I.Forst.) P.I.Forst.
Coleus orthodontus (Gürke) A.J.Paton
Coleus otostegioides (Schweinf. ex Gürke) A.J.Paton
Coleus pallidus (Wall. ex Benth.) A.J.Paton
Coleus paniculatus Benth.
Coleus parishii (Hook.f.) A.J.Paton
Coleus parvicalyx (A.J.Paton) A.J.Paton
Coleus penicillatus (A.J.Paton) A.J.Paton
Coleus pentheri Gürke
Coleus perrieri (Hedge) A.J.Paton & Phillipson
Coleus persoonii Benth.
Coleus petiolatissimus Briq.
Coleus petraeus (Backer ex Adelb.) A.J.Paton
Coleus petricola (J.Mathew & B.J.Conn) A.J.Paton
Coleus phulangkaensis (Suddee, Suphuntee & Saengrit) Suddee
Coleus plantagineus (Hook.f.) A.J.Paton
Coleus platyphyllus (A.J.Paton) A.J.Paton
Coleus pobeguinii Hutch. & Dalziel
Coleus polystachyus (Benth.) A.J.Paton
Coleus porcatus (van Jaarsv. & P.J.D.Winter) A.J.Paton
Coleus porphyranthus (T.J.Edwards & N.R.Crouch) A.J.Paton
Coleus prittwitzii (Perkins) A.J.Paton
Coleus prostratus (Gürke) A.J.Paton
Coleus psammophilus (Codd) A.J.Paton
Coleus pseudospeciosus (Buscal. & Muschl.) A.J.Paton
Coleus pulchellus (P.I.Forst.) P.I.Forst.
Coleus rafidahiae Kiew
Coleus recurvata (Ryding) A.J.Paton
Coleus repens Gürke
Coleus reticulatus A.Chev.
Coleus rhodesianum (N.E.Br.) A.J.Paton
Coleus robustus (Hook.f.) A.J.Paton
Coleus rotundifolius (Poir.) A.Chev. & Perrot
Coleus ruandensis (De Wild.) A.J.Paton
Coleus rutenbergianus (Vatke) A.J.Paton & Phillipson
Coleus sahyadricus (Smitha & Sunojk.) Smitha
Coleus sallyae (A.J.Paton) A.J.Paton
Coleus sanguineus (Britten) A.J.Paton
Coleus saxorum (J.Mathew, Yohannan & B.J.Conn) Smitha
Coleus scaber (Benth.) A.J.Paton
Coleus scandens Gürke
Coleus scebeli Chiov.
Coleus schizophyllus (Baker) A.J.Paton
Coleus schliebenii (Mildbr.) A.J.Paton
Coleus scruposus A.J.Paton
Coleus scutellarioides (L.) Benth.
Coleus seretii De Wild.
Coleus sessilifolius (A.J.Paton) A.J.Paton
Coleus shirensis Gürke
Coleus shoolamudianus (Sunil & Naveen Kum.) Smitha & A.J.Paton
Coleus sigmoideus (A.J.Paton) A.J.Paton
Coleus socotranus (Radcl.-Sm.) A.J.Paton
Coleus sphaerocephalus (Baker) A.J.Paton
Coleus splendens (P.I.Forst.) P.I.Forst.
Coleus splendidus A.Chev.
Coleus stachyoides (Oliv.) E.A.Bruce
Coleus steenisii (H.Keng) A.J.Paton
Coleus stenostachys (Baker) A.J.Paton & Phillipson
Coleus strictipes (G.Taylor) A.J.Paton
Coleus strobilifer (Roxb.) A.J.Paton
Coleus stuhlmannii (Gürke) A.J.Paton
Coleus suaveolens (S.T.Blake) P.I.Forst. & T.C.Wilson
Coleus subspicatus (Hochst.) Walp.
Coleus succulentus Pax
Coleus suffruticosus (Wight) A.J.Paton
Coleus sylvestris (Gürke) A.J.Paton & Phillipson
Coleus tenuicaulis Hook.f.
Coleus tetradenifolius (A.J.Paton) A.J.Paton
Coleus tetragonus (Gürke) Robyns & Lebrun
Coleus thalassoscopicus (P.I.Forst.) P.I.Forst.
Coleus thyrsoideus Baker
Coleus togoensis (Perkins) A.J.Paton
Coleus tomentifolius (Suddee) Suddee
Coleus torrenticola (P.I.Forst.) P.I.Forst.
Coleus triangularis (A.J.Paton) A.J.Paton
Coleus trullatus (A.J.Paton) A.J.Paton
Coleus umbrosus Vatke
Coleus unguentarius (Codd) A.J.Paton
Coleus urticifolius Benth.
Coleus velutinus (Trimen) A.J.Paton
Coleus venteri (van Jaarsv. & Hankey) A.J.Paton
Coleus ventosus (P.I.Forst.) P.I.Forst.
Coleus venustus (P.I.Forst.) P.I.Forst.
Coleus verticillatus (Baker) A.J.Paton
Coleus vettiveroides K.C.Jacob
Coleus veyretiae (Guillaumet & A.Cornet) A.J.Paton & Phillipson
Coleus villosus (Forssk.) A.J.Paton
Coleus wallamanensis (T.C.Wilson & P.I.Forst.) T.C.Wilson & P.I.Forst.
Coleus welwitschii Briq.
Coleus xanthanthus C.Y.Wu & Y.C.Huang
Coleus xerophilus (Codd) A.J.Paton
Coleus xylopodus (Lukhoba & A.J.Paton) A.J.Paton
Coleus yemenensis A.J.Paton
Coleus zombensis (Baker) Mwany.

Formerly accepted species
Coleus coerulescens Gürke, synonym of Coleus barbatus var. barbatus
Coleus macranthus Merr., synonym of Coleus scutellarioides
Coleus sparsiflorus Elmer, synonym of Coleus galeatus

References

 
Coleus